Stanhopea tricornis is a species of orchid endemic to western South America (Colombia).

References

External links 

tricornis
Orchids of Colombia